Calvez is a surname, and may refer to;

Calvez derives from kalvez which means carpenter in Breton. (cf. Kalvez)

 Anne-Sophie Calvez - French figure skater
 Léon Le Calvez - French professional road bicycle racer
 Jean-Yves Calvez - French Jesuit, theologian, philosopher, economist, expert in Marxism and professor of social philosophy.

References

External links
Distribution of the surname Calvez in France

Breton-language surnames